1968 Soviet Class B was a Soviet football competition at the Soviet third tier.

Russian Federation

Semifinal Group 1
 [Bryansk]

Semifinal Group 2
 [Rybinsk]

Semifinal Group 3
 [Pyatigorsk]

Semifinal Group 4
 [Sverdlovsk]

Semifinal Group 5
 [Belgorod]

Semifinal Group 6
 [Prokopyevsk]

Final group
 [Nov 4-17, Pyatigorsk]

Ukraine

Final Group
 [Oct 25 – Nov 7, Ternopol, Chernovtsy]

Match for 1st place 
 Avangard Ternopol  2-0  Bukovina Chernovtsy

Kazakhstan

Match for 1st place 
 Yenbek Jezkazgan  2-0  ADK Alma-Ata

Central Asia

References
 All-Soviet Archive Site
 Results. RSSSF

Soviet Second League seasons
3
Soviet
Soviet